Wet Paint is a 1946 American animated short film directed by Jack King and produced by Walt Disney, featuring Donald Duck. In the short film, Donald re-paints his car, and a bird lands on it. In the mayhem that ensues, the car ends up covered with handprints, spotted a dozen different colors, stripped of paint, and covered with the stuffing from the seats so that it resembles a sheepdog.

Plot
Donald's brand new paint job on his car is threatened by a bird that only wants a thread for its nest.

Voice cast
 Clarence Nash as Donald Duck

Home media
The short was released on December 6, 2005, on Walt Disney Treasures: The Chronological Donald, Volume Two: 1942-1946.

References

External links
 
 Wet Paint at The Internet Animation Database
 Wet Paint on BFI
 Wet Paint on Filmaffinity

Donald Duck short films
Films produced by Walt Disney
1940s Disney animated short films
Films directed by Jack Hannah
Films scored by Oliver Wallace
1946 animated films
1946 films